The coat of arms of Regina, Saskatchewan is the full armorial achievement as used by the municipal government as an official symbol.

Regina, Saskatchewan
Regina, Saskatchewan
Regina
Regina
Regina